My Style is a fashion and self-help book written by the Australian entertainer Dannii Minogue, released in September 2011.

Fashion
My Style, boutique Marijana Matthäus

Music
My Style,  mini album by Brown Eyed Girls 2008
"My Style", song by Nicky James
"My Style", song by Mao Denda
"My Style", song by F(x) (band)
"My Style", song by Cho PD
"My Style", song by The Black Eyed Peas from Monkey Business, 2005 
"My Style", song by Poppy from Poppy.Computer, 2017
"My Style", song from the soundtrack Scratch
"My Style", song from Forbidden Paradise 7: Deep Forest
"My Style", song by Eskay